The following highways are numbered 274:

Canada
Manitoba Provincial Road 274

Japan
 Japan National Route 274

United States
 Interstate 274 (future)
 California State Route 274 (former)
 Florida State Road 274 (former)
 Georgia State Route 274
 K-274 (Kansas highway)
 Kentucky Route 274
 Maryland Route 274
 Minnesota State Highway 274
 Montana Secondary Highway 274
 New York State Route 274
 North Carolina Highway 274
 Ohio State Route 274
 Pennsylvania Route 274
 South Carolina Highway 274
 Tennessee State Route 274
 Texas State Highway 274
 Texas State Highway Loop 274
 Farm to Market Road 274 (Texas)
 Utah State Route 274
 Virginia State Route 274
 Washington State Route 274